AmaderGaan.com was an online music portal of Bangladesh. AmaderGaan also was the only legal online music shop of Bangladesh.

History 
AmaderGaan was founded by Faysal Islam on 31 July 2002. Safwan Khan joined later that year. Initially a website was conceived that would be a meeting place for discussing and sharing music. It Provided free Bengali mp3 for a long time as there was no proper legal system in place back then. In following years, many musicians and music lovers joined the community such as veteran musicians like Maqsoodul Haque (Mac), formerly of Feedback and currently with In Dhaka and musicians from Rockstrata, Cryptic Fate, Arbovirus, The Watson Brothers, Zefyr, RaaGa, and Artcell. With the assistance of Mac, amaderGaan took on a major jump from the virtual to the real world in 2004 with the arranging of a charity concert for Abdur Rahman Boyati, an aging folk musician famous for singing in the style of bauls and boyatis. In 2005, the organization started a 24-hour online radio station in Bengali. amaderGaan took up the cause of 35 solo musicians and bands to promote and host their websites. In 2005, sharing of music was stopped and the first online shop was set up to promote the purchasing of music legally. In 2006, amaderGaan and New Age, a daily newspaper of Dhaka, began jointly publishing a biweekly chart highlighting sales of the top-selling Bengali albums. Recently, NewAge has also been publishing articles written by amaderGaan members on its paper.

.Loud 
In 2006 AmaderGaan along with Sound Machine Ltd, a leading sound equipment sales and rental, audio and video production and musical event management company in Dhaka started a project titled .Loud (dot loud) to promote musicians all over Bangladesh and around the world via Internet and various other activities. Several artistes and musicians who became a part of the .Loud project will be receiving free web hosting space and domain from amadergaan.com with a 20% discount on recording costs and practice pads at Sound Machine and even official promotion of the respective bands.

Current Status 
Currently AmaderGaan.com is inactive. No news or anything else is known about how long it would be inactive.
Some band members hope that it'll be active soon.

References 

Online music stores of Bangladesh